Labordea prasina is a moth of the family Erebidae first described by Arthur Gardiner Butler in 1882. It is found in central Madagascar.

The wings of this species are pale green, the costal area bluer-green, divided by oblique snow-white dashes.

The male of this species has a wingspan of 30 mm. It was described by a specimen from Ankafana, central Madagascar.

See also
 List of moths of Madagascar

References

Erebidae
Lymantriinae
Moths described in 1882
Moths of Madagascar
Moths of Africa